Peirce may refer to:

Schools
 Peirce College, Philadelphia, formerly known as Peirce College of Business, Peirce Junior College and Peirce School of Business Administration
 Peirce School (also known as Old Peirce School), West Newton, Massachusetts
 Helen C. Peirce School of International Studies, an elementary school in Chicago

Others
 Peirce (crater), a lunar crater
 Peirce (given name), including a list of people with the given name
 Peirce (surname), including a list of people with the surname

See also 
 
 
 Pierce (disambiguation)
 Peirse (disambiguation)